Eliza K. Robertson is a Canadian writer.

She studied creative writing and political science at the University of Victoria and graduated with an MA in creative writing from the University of East Anglia in 2012, where she is currently pursuing a PhD in Creative and Critical Writing. Eliza was a joint winner of the 2013 Commonwealth Short Story Prize and has been longlisted twice for the prestigious Writers' Trust / McClelland & Stewart Journey Prize. She was a Journey Prize finalist in 2013 for "My Sister Sang."

Robertson's first full-length novel, Demi-Gods, was released in 2017.

Awards
2013 Journey Prize finalist for "My Sister Sang," published in Grain 
2013 Commonwealth Short Story Prize, We Walked On Water

Bibliography
 Wallflowers (2014) , 
 Demi-Gods (2017) ,

References

Living people
University of Victoria alumni
Alumni of the University of East Anglia
Canadian women short story writers
Writers from Vancouver
21st-century Canadian women writers
21st-century Canadian short story writers
Year of birth missing (living people)